El Rito may refer to:

 El Rito, Cibola County, New Mexico
 El Rito, Rio Arriba County, New Mexico
 El Rito, Taos County, New Mexico
 El Rito Presbyterian Church, a church in Chacón

See also
Rito (disambiguation)